Planeta Extremo (English: Extreme Planet) is a Brazilian television program. It was produced and aired by Rede Globo.

Synopsis 
A team of Brazilian journalists travel across four continents and face challenges and danger, yet encounter beauty and success.

References

Brazilian television series
Rede Globo original programming
Brazilian action television series
2015 Brazilian television series debuts
2015 Brazilian television series endings
Brazilian reality television series
Brazilian television news shows
Portuguese-language television shows